Lake Teletskoye is the largest lake in the Altai Mountains and the Altai Republic, Russia, and has depth up to 325 meters.

Annual water level fluctuations are estimated at some 348 sm. The lake transparency is high, with the visibility of the lake water ranging from six to fourteen meters.

About 70 rivers and 150 temporary streams flow into the lake, the largest of them, Chulyshman River, supplying more than half of the lake's water. The lake is drained through a single outlet, the Biya River, which, after its confluence with the Katun River, forms one of Siberia's largest rivers, the Ob River.

Lake Teletskoe is included into Altaisky Nature Reserve. That reserve along with the Katun Nature Reserve and the Ukok Plateau Nature Refuge were listed as one of UNESCO World Natural Heritage Sites under the name "Golden Mountains of Altai".

The Altai people have a legend about the name of the lake in their language, which means Golden Lake. According to this story, once, a rich man had an ingot of gold, which he wanted to use to buy food. He travelled around Altai, but could not find anyone who would sell him any food. Eventually, he threw the gold into the lake. This legend is the origin of the name.

Research 

There is a field base of Institute of Taxonomy and Ecology of Animals by the Siberian Division of the Russian Academy of Sciences at the northwest part of the lake, about 6 km from head water of Biya River. Therein studies are performed of the insect-eaters and rodents of Altai Republic, helminthofauna of vertebrates in biocenoses of taiga, ichthyocenose and animal plankton of Lake Teletskoye. Near the base there is located the research-and-production sport-and-sanitary base of Gorno-Altaisk State University. Tomsk State University has been conducting scientific research in the area for more than 50 years. Ecologists, geologists, and archeologists from Institute of Water and Ecological Problems the Siberian Division of the Russian Academy of Sciences from the Institute of Water and Ecological Problems spend many years working here to study the lake and surrounding area. Geomorphologists and geologists scrutinize geological structure of Lake Teletskoye, its paleogeography, age, and origin.

It has been known for a long time that there are gold in placers and bedrock deposits in the Altai. The Geomorphologists from Tomsk State University works in the Teletskoye geology-prospecting detachment searching for gold-placers. They managed to establish a new search criterion for a placer. The base for the discovery were the palaeoglaciological studies during the last few years and theoretical models of the diluvial morpholithogenesis. The content of the precious component is everywhere much higher than the lowest accepted industrial standard, sometimes it’s tremendous.

The investigators carried out large-scale exploration routes on vast territories near watersheds of the upper reaches of all the rivers in the northern and western parts of the Teletskoye Lake basin. These explorations included studies of exposures, boring of prospect-holes, pits and hollow wells (up to 15 m deep). The results of these investigations let us speak about the regularity and reliability of the new criterion. The first 14C-method data for the layered clays on the flat watersheds showed the age of 15 thousand years and younger. This important fact leads to an unavoidable conclusion about the youth of the Teletskoje Lake depression – the post-glacial age of “the last cutting” during the pre-glacial (Late Quaternary) peneplain.

References 
 Малолетко А. М. Телецкое озеро по исследованиям. 1973—1975 гг. / Изд. 2, перераб. — Томск, 2009. — 234 с.
 Николаева Н. А. Эхо песен Алтын-Кёля. Сказка. Барнаул:ООО «Принт-инфо», 2005.-128с.;1000 экз. 
 Дулькейт, Тигрий Георгиевич. Телецкое озеро в легендах и былях. 2-е изд. Бийск: НИЦ БиГПИ, 1999. — 160 с. 
 Будников А. Л., Рудой, Алексей Николаевич. Дилювий Северо-Восточного Алтая: Новые данные // «Научные чтения памяти. Селиверстов, Юрий Петрович (Селиверстовские чтения)». — СПб, 2009. — С. 399—405.
 Будников А. Л., Рудой А. Н. Новые находки ленточных глин на территории Северо-Восточного Алтая // Материалы Всероссийского совещания по изучению четвертичный период — Новосибирск, 2009. 19-23 окт. 2009. — С. 94-100.
 Будников А. Л., Рудой А. Н. Дилювиально-аккумулятивные образования Северо-Восточного Алтая: новые данные

Notes

External links

 "Climate, ice, water, landscapes". Фотогалерея (более 300 фотографий) экспедиций Томского государственного университета в бассейн Телецкого озера 2008-2010 годов.

Lakes of the Altai Republic
LTeletskoye
South Siberian Mountains